No Depression may refer to:
 No Depression (magazine), a roots music website and quarterly print journal (2015-present). Formerly a bi-monthly roots music magazine (published 1995–2008).
 "No Depression in Heaven", a 1936 song popularized by the Carter Family
 No Depression (album), a 1990 album by the alternative country band Uncle Tupelo

See also 
 "No Depression in New Zealand" (1981), a song by Blam Blam Blam